This is a list of compositions by Giovanni Pierluigi da Palestrina, sorted by genre. The volume (given in parentheses for motets) refers to the volume of the Breitkopf & Härtel complete edition in which the work can be found. Six of the volumes of masses and some of his motets and other works were published in these editions during Palestrina's lifetime. Others were collected later, from papal choirbooks and other sources. The dates of most pieces are unknown, unless they were known to have been composed in connection with some celebration. Of those works published during Palestrina's lifetime, many were composed considerably earlier than their date of publication, and of the others a large number remained unpublished until the 19th century.

The 32 volumes of Palestrina's collected works were published by Breitkopf & Härtel between 1862 and 1907. The volumes of the masses maintain the order of works in the previously published volumes (with the Collected Works Vol. 10 corresponding to the first book of Masses, and so on.) Some of the pieces in the last three volumes, 30–32, are considered spurious or doubtful.

Masses

Motets
The numbers in brackets represent the volume that the work is part of.

Four voices
 Ad Dominum cum tribularer. Sagittae potentis (5)
 Adoramus te, Christe (5)
 Ad te levavi oculos meos. Miserere nostri Domine (5)
 Alma Redemptoris Mater (5) 
 Ascendens Christus in altum (7)
 Ave Maria gratia plena (5)
 Ave Regina caelorum. Gaude gloriosa (5)
 Beatus Laurentius (5)
 Beatus vir qui suffert (5)
 Benedicta sit sancta Trinitas (5)
 Benedictus Dominus Deus (30)
 Confitemini Domino (5)
 Congratulamini mihi omnes (4)
 Deus, qui animae famuli tui Gregorii (7)
 Dies sanctificatus (5)
 Doctor bonus (5)
 Domine quando veneris. Commissa mea (5)
 Domine, secundum actum meum (7)
 Dum aurora finem daret (5)
 Ecce nunc benedicite Dominum (5)
 Ecce nunc benedicite Dominum (7)
 Ego sum panis vivus (5)
 Exaudi Domine (5)
 Fuit homo missus a Deo (5)
 Fundamenta ejus. Numquid Sion dicet (5)
 Gaude Barbara beata (7)
 Gaudent in coelis (5)
 Gloriosi principes (5)
 Haec dies quam fecit (5)
 Heu mihi Domine. Anima mea turbata (5)
 Hic est vere martyr (5)
 Hodie beata virgo Maria (5)
 In diebus illis (5)
 Innocentes pro Christo infantes (7)
 Iste est qui ante Deum (5)
 Isti sunt viri sancti (5)
 Jesus junxit se discipulis (5)
 Lapidabant Stephanum (5)
 Lauda Sion Salvatorem (5)
 Loquebantur variis linguis (5)
 Magnus haereditatis mysterium (5)
 Magnus sanctus Paulus (5)
 Miserere mei Deus (30)
 Missa Herodes spiculatore (5)
 Nativitatis tua (5)
 Ne recorderis peccata mea, Domine (7)
 Nos autem gloriari (5)
 O quam suavis est (30)
 O quantus luctus (5)
 O Rex gloriae (5)
 Princeps gloriosissime Michael Archangele (7)
 Pueri Hebraeorum (5)
 Quae est ista (5)
 Quam pulchri sunt (5)
 Quia vidisti me Thoma (5)
 Salvator mundi salva nos (5)
 Salve Regina. Eia ergo advocata nostra (5)
 Sicut cervus desiderat. Sitivit anima mea (5)
 Sub tuum praesidium (5)
 Super flumina Babylonis (5)
 Surge, propera amica mea (5)
 Surrexit pastor bonus (5)
 Tollite jugum meum (5)
 Tribus miraculis (5)
 Tu es pastor ovium (5)
 Valde honorandus est (5)
 Veni sponsa Christi (5)

Five voices
Those marked with an asterisk form a cycle of 29 settings from the Canticum Canticorum.
 Adjuro vos, filiae Hierusalem* (4)
 Aegypte noli flere (4)
 Alleluia! tulerunt Dominum (1)
 Angelus Domini descendit de coelo. Et introeuntes in monumentum (3)
 Apparuit caro suo (4)
 Ardens est cor meum (4)
 Ascendo ad patrem meum. Ego rogabo patrem (2)
 Ave Maria (3)
 Ave Regina coelorum (4)
 Ave Trinitatis sanctuarium (4)
 Beatae Mariae Magdalenae (1)
 Beatus Laurentius orabat (1)
 Canite tuba in Sion. Rorate coeli (2)
 Cantantibus organis. Biduanis ac triduanis (3)
 Caput ejus aurum optimum* (4)
 Caro mea vere est cibus (3)
 Coenantibus illis accepit Jesus (2)
 Congrega, Domine. Afflige opprimentes nos (3)
 Corona aurea. Domine praevenisti eum (2)
 Crucem sanctam subiit (1)
 Cum pervenisset beatus Andreas (1)
 Derelinquat implus viam (2)
 Descendi in hortum meum* (4)
 Deus qui dedisti legem (1)
 Dilectus meus descendit in hortum suum* (4)
 Dilectus meus mihi et ego illi* (4)
 Domine Deus, qui conteris. Tu Domine (3)
 Domine secundum actum meum (4)
 Dominus Jesus in qua nocte (2)
 Duo ubera tua* (4)
 Ecce merces sanctorum (4)
 Ecce tu pulcher es, dilecte mi* (4)
 Ego sum panis vivus. Panis quem ego dabo (1)
 Exi cito in plateas (2)
 Exsultate Deo (4)
 Fasciculus myrrhae* (4)
 Fuit homo missus a Deo. Erat Joannes in deserto (3)
 Gaude Barbara beata. Gaude quia meruisti (2)
 Gaude gloriosa (4)
 Guttur tuum sicut* (4)
 Hic est discipulus ille (1)
 Hodie nata est beata Virgo (1)
 Homo quidam fuit (2)
 Inclytae sanctae virginis Catherinae (3)
 In illo tempore egressus (2)
 Introduxit me rex in cellam* (4)
 Jubilate Deo, omnis terra. Laudate nomen ejus (3)
 Laetus Hyperboream. O patruo pariterque (4)
 Laeva ejus sub capite meo* (4)
 Lapidabant Stephanum (1)
 Manifesto vobis veritatem. Pax vobis, noli timere (3)
 Memor esto verbi tui servo tuo (2)
 Nigra sum, sed formosa* (4)
 O admirabile commercium (1)
 O Antoni eremita (1)
 O beata et gloriosa Trinitas. O vera summa sempiterna Trinitas (1)
 O beatum pontificem (1)
 O beatum virum (1)
 O lux et decus. O singulare praesidium (3)
 Omnipotens sempiterne Deus (3)
 O quam metuendus (3)
 Orietur stella (4)
 O sacrum convivium (2)
 O sancte praesul Nicolae. Gaude praesul optime (3)
 Osculetur me osculo oris sui* (4)
 O Virgo simul et Mater (2)
 Parce mihi Domine. Peccavi, peccavi (4)
 Pater noster (3)
 Paucitas dierum meorum. Manus tuae Domine (4)
 Peccantem me quotidie (2)
 Puer qui natus est (1)
 Pulchra es amica mea* (4)
 Pulchrae sunt genae tuae* (4)
 Quae est ista* (4)
 Quam pulchra es et quam decora* (4)
 Quam pulchri sunt gressus (1)
 Quam pulchri sunt gressus tui* (4)
 Quid habes Hester. Vidi te Domine (3)
 Quodcumque ligaveris (6)
 Rex Melchior (4)
 Salve Regina. Eia ergo advocata (4)
 Sancte Paule apostole (1)
 Sanctificavit Dominus (3)
 Senex puerum portabat. Hodie beata virgo Maria (1)
 Sic Deus dilexit mundum (4)
 Sicut lilium inter spinas (1)
 Sicut lilium inter spinas* (4)
 Si ignoras te, o pulchra inter mulieres* (4)
 Stella quam viderant magi (1)
 Surgam et circuibo civitatem* (4)
 Surge amica mea, speciosa mea* (4)
 Surge Petre (4)
 Surge, propera amica mea* (4)
 Surge sancte Dei. Ambula sancte Dei (4)
 Suscipe verbum virgo Maria. Paries quidem filium (1)
 Tempus est, ut revertar. Nisi ego abiero (4)
 Tota pulchra es, amica mea* (4)
 Tradent enim vos (3)
 Trahe me post te* (4)
 Tribulationes civitatum. Peccavimus (4)
 Tu es pastor ovium (6)
 Unus ex duobus (1)
 Venit Michael Archangelus (1)
 Veni, veni dilecte me* (4)
 Videns secundus (4)
 Vineam meam non custodivi* (4)
 Vox dilecti mei* (4)
 Vulnerasti cor meum* (4)

Six voices
 Accepit Jesus calicem (3)
 Assumpta est Maria (6)
 Beata Barbara. Gloriosam mortem (2)
 Cantabo Domino in vita mea. Deficiant peccatores (2)
 Columna es immobilis (3)
 Congratulamini mihi [not in Complete Works]
 Cum autem esset Stephanus (6)
 Cum inducerent puerum Jesum (6)
 Cum ortus fuerit (3)
 Deus qui ecclesiam tuam (3)
 Dum complerentur dies pentecostes. Dum ergo essent in unum discipuli (1)
 Eia ergo, advocata nostra (7)
 Haec dies, quam fecit Dominus (3)
 Hic est beatissimus Evangelista (6)
 Hic est discipulus ille (6)
 Hierusalem, cito veniet salus tua. Ego enim sum Dominus (2)
 Judica me, Deus, et discerne (3)
 O bone Jesu (3)
 O Domine Jesu Christe (1)
 O magnum mysterium. Quem vidistis pastores (1)
 Positis autem genibus (6)
 Pulchra es, o Maria virgo (1)
 Quae est ista (6)
 Responsum accepit Simeon (6)
 Rex pacificus (3)
 Salve Regina, mater misericordiae (7)
 Sancta et immaculata Virginitas. Benedicta tu (2)
 Solve jubente Deo. Quodcunque ligaveris (1)
 Susanna ab improbis. Postquam autem (3)
 Tradent enim vos in conciliis (6)
 Tribularer si nescirem. Secundum multitudinem dolorum (2)
 Tu es Petrus. Quodcunque ligaveris (2)
 Veni Domine et noli tardare. Excita Domine (2)
 Vidi turbam magnam. Et omnes angeli stabant (1)
 Viri Galilaei quid statis. Ascendit Deus in jubilatione (1)

Seven voices
 Tu es Petrus (1)
 Virgo prudentissima. Maria virgo (1)

Eight voices
 Alma Redemptoris Mater (6)
 Alma Redemptoris Mater (7)
 Apparuit gratia Dei (7)
 Ave Maria, gratia plena (6)
 Ave mundi spes, Maria (6)
 Ave Regina coelorum (3)
 Ave Regina coelorum (7)
 Beata es, virgo Maria (6)
 Caro mea vere est cibus (6)
 Confitebor tibi Domine. Notas facite in populis (2)
 Congratulamini mihi onmes (7)
 Dies sanctificatus illuxit nobis (7)
 Disciplinam et sapientiam docuit (6)
 Domine in virtute tua. Magna est gloria ejus (2)
 Ecce veniet dies illa (7)
 Etenim Pascha nostrum (6)
 Et increpavit eos dicens (6)
 Expurgate vetus fermentum (6)
 Fili, non te fragant labores (7)
 Fratres, ego enim accepi (6)
 Haec dies, quam fecit Dominus (7)
 Haec est dies praeclara (7)
 Hic est panis (6)
 Hodie Christus natus est (3)
 Hodie gloriosa semper virgo Maria (6)
 Jesus junxit se discipulis (6)
 Jubilate Deo (3)
 Lauda Sion Salvatorem (3)
 Lauda Sion Salvatorem (7)
 Laudate Dominum in sanctis (30)
 Laudate Dominum omnes gentes (2)
 Laudate pueri Dominum. Quis sicut Dominus Deus (2)
 Magnus sanctus Paulus (7)
 Nunc dimittis servum tuum (7)
 O admirabile commercium (7)
 O bone Jesu, exaudi me (6)
 O Domine Jesu Christe (6)
 Omnes gentes plaudite (7)
 O pretiosum et admirandum convivium (7)
 O quam suavis est, Domine, spiritus tuus (6)
 Pater noster, qui es in coelis (6)
 Regina coeli, laetare (6)
 Regina mundi, hodie (6)
 Salve Regina, mater misericordiae (6)
 Sancte Paule Apostole (7)
 Spiritus Sanctus replevit (6)
 Stabat Mater dolorosa (6)
 Sub tuum praesidium (6)
 Surge illuminare Hierusalem (3). Et ambulabant gentes in lumine (6)
 Surrexit pastor bonus (6)
 Tria sunt munera pretiosa (7)
 Veni Sancte Spiritus (3)
 Veni Sancte Spiritus (7)
 Victimae Paschali laudes (7)
 Videntes stellam Magi (7)
 Vos amici mei estis (30)

Twelve voices
 Ecce nunc benedicite Dominum (7)
 Laudate Dominum in tympanis (7)
 Laudate nomen ejus (26)
 Nunc dimittis servum tuum (7)
 O quam bonus et suavis (26)
 Stabat Mater dolorosa (7) (attributed by some writers to Felice Anerio)

Hymns for four voices
(All in Volume 8)
 Ad coenam Agni providi
 Ad preces nostras
 A solis ortu cardine
 Aurea luce
 Ave maris stella
 Christe qui lux es
 Christe Redemptor omnium (2 settings)
 Conditor alme siderum
 Decus morum dux
 Deus tuorum militum (2 settings)
 Doctor egregie
 En gratulemur hodie
 Exultet coelum laudibus
 Hostis Herodes impie
 Hujus obtentu
 Hymnus canoris
 Iste confessor
 Jesu corona virginum (2 settings)
 Jesu nostra redemptio
 Lauda mater ecclesiae
 Laudibus summis
 Lucis creator optime
 Magne pater Augustine
 Mensis Augusti
 Nunc jurat celsi
 O lux beata Trinitas
 Pange lingua gloriosi
 Petrus beatus
 Prima lux surgens
 Proles de coelo prodiit
 Quicumque Christum Quærtis
 Quodcumque vinclis
 Rex gloriose martyrum
 Salvete flores martyrum
 Sanctorum meritis
 Tibi Christe, splendor patris
 Tristes erant apostoli
 Urbs beata Jerusalem
 Ut queant laxis
 Veni Creator Spiritus
 Vexilla Regis prodeunt (2 settings)

Offertories for five voices
(All in Volume 9)
 Ad te, Domine, levavi
 Afferentur regi virgines
 Angelus Domini descendit
 Anima nostra sicut
 Ascendit Deus in jubilatione
 Assumpta est Maria
 Ave Maria, gratia plena
 Benedicam Dominum
 Benedicite gentes
 Benedictus Domine
 Benedictus sit Deus
 Benedixisti Domine
 Bonum est confiteri
 Confessio et pulchritudo
 Confirma hoc Deus
 Confitebor tibi Domine
 Confitebuntur coeli
 Constitues eos principes
 De profundis
 Deus conversus
 Deus enim firmavit
 Deus meus ad te
 Dextera domini fecit
 Diffusa est gratia
 Domine convertere
 Domine Deus, in simplicitate
 Domine in auxilium
 Elegerunt apostoli
 Exaltabo te Domine
 Expectans expectavi
 Illumina oculos meos
 Immittet angelus
 Improperium expectavit
 In omnem terram exivit
 In te speravi
 Inveni David
 Jubilate Deo omnis
 Jubilate Deo universa
 Justitiae Domine rectae (2 settings)
 Justorum animae
 Justus ut palma (2 settings)
 Laetamini in Domino
 Lauda anima mea
 Laudate Dominum quia
 Meditabor in mandatis
 Mihi autem nimis
 Oravi ad Dominum
 Perfice gressus meos
 Populum humilem
 Posuisti Domine
 Precatus est Moyses
 Recordare mei
 Reges Tharsis et insulae
 Sacerdotes Domini
 Sanctificavit Moyses
 Scapulis suis
 Si ambulavero
 Sicut in holocaustis
 Sperent in te omnes
 Stetit angelus
 Super flumina Babylonis
 Terra tremuit
 Tu es Petrus
 Tui sunt coeli
 Veritas mea
 Vir erat in terra

Lamentations
All in Volume 25. There are 4 settings: (1) for 4 and 5 voices, (2) for 3, 4, 5, 6, and 8 voices, (3) for 3, 4, 5, and 6 voices, and (4) for 3, 4, 5, and 6 voices.
 Incipit lamentatio Jeremiae Prophetae. Aleph. Quomodo sedet.
 Vau. Et egressus est a filia Sion.
 Jod. Manum suam misit hostis.
 De lamentatione Jeremiae Prophetae. Heth. Cogitavit.
 Lamed. Matribus suis dixerunt.
 Aleph. Ego vir.
 De lamentatione Jeremiae Prophetae. Heth. Misericordiae Domini.
 Aleph. Quomodo obscuratum est aurum.
 Incipit oratio Jeremiae Prophetae.

Litanies
(All in Volume 26)
 Litaniae de B. Virgine Maria inest Ave Maria (3 and 4 voices)
 Litaniae de B. Virgine Maria (5 voices)
 Litaniae de B. Virgine Maria (6 voices)
 Litaniae de B. Virgine Maria (8 voices; 2 settings)
 Litaniae deiparae Virginis inest Ave Maria (4 voices)
 Litaniae Domini (8 voices; 3 settings)
 Litaniae Sacrosanctae Eucharistiae (8 voices; 2 settings)

Psalms
(All in Volume 26)
 Ad te levavi oculos meos (Ps. 122)
 Beati omnes, qui timent Dominum (Ps. 127)
 Domine, quis habitabit (Ps. 14)
 Jubilate Deo omnis terra (Ps. 99)

Antiphon
 Salve Regina (4, 8, and 12 voices)

Magnificats
(All in Volume 27)
 First tone (5 settings)
 Second tone (4 settings)
 Third tone (4 settings), including a melody widely used today in the resurrection hymn tune, Victory (The Strife Is O'er)
 Fourth tone (5 settings)
 Fifth tone (5 settings)
 Sixth tone (4 settings)
 Seventh tone (4 settings)
 Eighth tone (4 settings)

Cantiones sacrae
(All in Volume 30)
 Benedictus Dominus Deus (4 voices)
 Illumina oculos (doubtful; 3 voices)
 In Domino laetabitur (doubtful; 4 voices)
 Laudate Dominum in sanctis (8 voices)
 Miserere mei, Deus (4 voices)
 O quam suavis est (4 voices)
 Vos amici mei estis (8 voices)

Spiritual madrigals

Three voices
 Jesu, Rex admirabilis (30)
 Tua Jesu dilectio (30)
 Jesu, sommo conforto (not included)
 Rex virtutem (not included)

Four voices
 Jesu, flos matris (30)

Five voices
(All in Volume 29)
 Al fin, madre di Dio
 Amor, senza il tuo dono
 Anzi, se foco e ferro
 Cedro gentil
 Città di Dio
 Dammi, scala del ciel
 Dammi, vermiglia rosa
 Dunque divin Spiracolo
 E con i raggi tuoi
 E dal letto
 Ed arda ornor
 Eletta Mirra
 E quella certa speme
 E questo spirto
 E, se fur gia
 E, se il pensier
 E, se mai voci
 E, se nel foco
 E tua mercè
 E tu, anima mia
 E tu Signor
 Fa, che con l' acque tue
 Figlio immortal
 Giammai non resti
 Ma so ben, Signor
 Non basta ch' una volta
 Novella Aurora
 O cibo di dolcezza
 O Jesu dolce
 O manna saporito
 O refrigerio acceso
 Orto che sei si chiuso
 Orto sol, che
 O solo incoronato
 Paraclito amoroso
 Per questo, Signor mio
 Quanto più t' offend' io
 Regina delle vergini
 Santo Altare
 Se amarissimo fiele
 Signor, dammi scienza
 S' io non ti conoscessi
 Specchio che fosti
 Spirito santo, Amore
 Tu di fortezza torre
 Tu sei soave fiume
 Vello di Gedeon
 Vergine bella
 Vergine chiara
 Vergine pura
 Vergine, quante lagrime
 Vergine saggia
 Vergine santa
 Vergine sola al mondo
 Vergine, tale è terra
 Vincitrice de l' empia idra

Secular madrigals
(All in Volume 28)
 Ahi che quest' occhi
 Alla riva del Tebro
 Amor, ben puoi
 Amor, che meco
 Amor, Fortuna
 Amor, quando fioria
 Ardo lungi
 Beltà, se com'
 Che debbo far
 Che non fia
 Chiara, sì chiaro
 Chi dunque fia
 Chi estinguera
 Com' in più negre
 Così la fama
 Così le chiome
 Da così dotta man sei
 Deh! fuss' or
 Deh or foss' io
 Dido chi giace
 Dolor non fu
 Donna bell' e gentil
 Donna gentil
 Donna, vostra mercede
 Ecc' oscurati
 Ecc' ove giunse
 Eran le vostre lagrime
 Febbre, ond' or
 Fu l' ardor grave
 Già fu chi m' ebbe cara
 Gioia m'abond'
 Gitene liete rime
 Godete dunque
 Il dolce sonno
 Il tempo vola
 Io dovea ben
 Io felice sarei
 Io sento qui d' intorno
 Io son ferito
 I vaghi fiori
 Ivi vedrai
 La cruda mia
 La ver l' aurora
 Le selv' avea
 Lontan dalla mia diva
 Mai fù più cruda
 Ma voi, fioriti
 Mentre a le dolci
 Mentre ch' al mar
 Mirate altrove
 Morì quasi il mio core
 Nè spero
 Nessun visse giammai
 Non son le vostre mani
 O bella Ninfa
 O che splendor
 Ogni beltà
 Ogni loco
 Oh! felici ore
 O me felice
 Onde seguendo
 Ovver de' sensi
 Partomi donna
 Perchè s' annida
 Per mostrar gioia
 Pero contento
 Placide l' acque
 Poscia che
 Pose un gran foco
 Prima vedransi
 Prima vedrassi
 Privo di fede
 Quai rime
 Quando dal terzo cielo
 Quando fe loro
 Queste saranno
 Questo doglioso
 Rara beltà
 Rime, dai sospir
 Saggio e santo pastor
 Se ben non veggon
 Se di pianti
 Se fra quest' erb'
 Se lamentar
 Se 'l pensier
 Se non fusse il pensier
 Si è debile il filo
 S' i' 'l dissi mai
 Soave fia il morir
 Struggomi
 S' un sguardo
 Vaghi pensier
 Vedrassi prima
 Veramente in amore
 Vestiva i colli

Cantiones profanae
(All in Volume 30)
 Amor, se pur sei dio (4 voices)
 Anima, dove sei (5 voices)
 Chiare, fresche, e dolci acque (4 voices)
 Con dolce, altiero ed amoroso cenno (4 voices)
 Da fuoco così bel (4 voices)
 Donna, presso al cui viso (5 voices)
 Dunque perfido amante (5 voices)
 Il caro è morto (5 voices)
 Non fu già suon di trombe (5 voices)
 Quand', ecco, donna (5 voices)
 Se dai soavi accenti (4 voices)
 Voi mi poneste in fuoco (4 voices)

Other
There are also works ascribed to Palestrina in the archives of the Julian Chapel, from the archives of the Pontifical Chapel, from the Vatican Library, from the archives of St. John Lateran, from the archives of Santa Maria Maggiore, from the library of the Roman College, and various other collections, included in Volumes 30, 31 and 32. Many of these, however, are considered doubtful or spurious.

Notes

References
 Henry Coates. Palestrina. Westport, CT: Hyperion Press, 1991 [1938]
 Zoë Kendrick Pyne. Giovanni Pierluigi da Palestrina: His Life and Times. Westport, CT: Greenwood Press, 1970 [1922]

External links
 Complete Works at IMSLP

Palestrina